Athleta Christi was a class of Early Christian soldier martyrs or military saints, of whom the most familiar example is probably Saint Sebastian. It also could be used to refer to Christians with exemplary martial prowess, especially when fighting against non-Christians or heretics.

Usage
Since the 15th century, the title has been a political one, granted by Popes to men who have led military campaigns defending Christianity. The militant Catholic hymn Athleta Christi nobilis ("Noble Champion of the Lord"), a hymn for Matins on May 18, the feast of Saint Venantius, was written in the 17th century by an unknown author. The medieval precursors of the hymn are numerous and include hymns, responsories and antiphons dedicated to many saints and martyrs, even non-militant ones such as Cosmas and Damian.

Those who have held the title include:
 Louis I of Hungary, called upon by Pope Innocent VI.
Simon de Montfort, called so by Peter of Vaux de Cernay.
 John Hunyadi of Hungary, called by Pope Pius II.
 George Kastrioti Skanderbeg of Albania, called by Popes Callixtus III, Pius II, Paul II, and Nicholas V.
 Stephen the Great of Moldavia, called by Pope Sixtus IV.
 Vlad the Impaler of Wallachia, called by Pope Sixtus IV.

See also 
 Miles Christianus

References

External links
 New Catholic Dictionary: Athleta Christi nobilis
   La Trobe University Library: Medieval Music Database: cf incipits O athleta Christi
  La Trobe University Library: Medieval Music Database: cf incipits Athleta Christi

15th-century establishments in Europe
Catholic martyrs
Religious leadership roles
Honorary titles of the Holy See